This is a List of notable Assamese poets (অসমীয়া কবি).

 Madhav Kandali (fl. 14th century)
 Hem Saraswati (fl. 14th century)
 Haribar Bipra (fl. 14th century)
 Sankardev (1449–1568)
 Madhavdev (1489–1596)
 Ananta Kandali (fl. 16th century)
 Bhattadev
 Sridhar Kandali
 Gopaldeva Bhawanipuria Aata (1551–1611)
 Jayadhwaj Singha (died 1663)
 Rudra Singha (died 1714)
 Kamalakanta Bhattacharya (1853–1936)
 Chadrakumar Agarwala (1867–1938)
 Hem Chandra Goswami (1872–1928)
 Lakshminath Bezbarua (1864–1938)
 Padmanath Gohain Baruah (1871–1946)
 Ananda Chandra Agarwala (1874–1939)
 Benudhar Rajkhowa (1872–1955)
 Kamalakanta Bhattacharya (1853–1936)
 Mafizuddin Ahmed Hazarika (1870–1958)
 Chandradhar Baruah (1874–1961)
 Raghunath Choudhary (1879–1968)
 Nalinibala Devi (1898–1977)
 Nilmoni Phukan (1880-1978)
 Dimbeswar Neog (1899–1966)
 Atul Chandra Hazarika (1903–1986)
 Jyoti Prasad Agarwalla (1903–1951)
 Mahendranath Dekaphukan (1903–1973)
 Parvati Prasad Baruva (1904-1964)
 Hem Barua (1915–1977)
 Nalinidhar Bhattacharya (1920-2016)
 Amulya Barua (1922–1946)
 Mahim Bora (1924-2016)
 Nabakanta Barua (1926–2002)
 Bhabananda Deka (1929–2006)
 Homen Borgohain (1931–2021)
 Hiren Bhattacharya (born 1932)
 Nilamani Phookan (born 1933)
 Hiren Gohain (born 1939)
Troilokya Bhattacharjya(1939-2013)
 Nalini Prava Deka (1944-2014)
 Harekrishna Deka (born 1948)
Baldev Mahanta (born 1950)
 Keshab Mahanta(1926-2006)
 Nirmal Prabha Bordoloi(1933-2004)
Syed Abdul Malik(1919–2000)
Ganesh Gogoi(1908-1938)
Sananta Tanty (Born 1952)
Samir Tati

References

Poets
Assamese